Cricket is an optional sport at the quadrennial Commonwealth Games. It first appeared at the 1998 Games, with a men's tournament seeing South Africa defeat Australia by 4 wickets in the final. Matches were played over 50 overs and had List A status rather than being full One Day Internationals.

The sport returned to the Games' programme at the 2022 Games, with a women's tournament taking place. Matches were played under the Twenty20 format, with the tournament won by Australia. A woman's Twenty20 tournament is planned to be part of the 2026 Games.

As is normal at the multi-sport events, Caribbean countries that enter participate as separate nations, not as the combined West Indies team. The England team represents only England and not Wales.

Venues 
  Kuala Lumpur 1998: PKNS (Finals), Tenaga National Sports Complex (Heats, Bronze playoff), Kelab Aman (Heats), Royal Military College (Heats), Rubber Research Institute Ground (Heats), Victoria Institution (Heats)
  Birmingham 2022: Edgbaston Cricket Ground
  Victoria 2026: Kardinia Park, Eastern Oval, Queen Elizabeth Oval, Ted Summerton Reserve

Men's tournament

Results

Performance by nation

Legend

GP – Group stage / First round

Women's tournament

Results

Performance by nation

Legend

GP – Group stage / First round

Medal table

Total

Men

Women

See also
 Cricket at the Asian Games
 Cricket at the Summer Olympics

References

 
Sports at the Commonwealth Games
Commonwealth Games